Barbie Bones was a rock band from Bergen, Norway that existed in the period 1987 to 1993. The band started under the name Monalisa Overdrive, and released two albums before it was dissolved. Under their first name, they released the EP Shake Me Hip in 1988. They then changed their name to Barbie Bones released their first album Brake For Nobody på EMI Music in 1990. The album was released worldwide, og bandet played concerts around in Europe and US. The second album, Death in the Rockinghorse Factory, was released in 1992 and it was awarded Spellemannprisen 1992 in the rock category. Despite good reviews, none of the albums achieved the big sales figures. This combined with problems with the follow-up from the record company led to the band being dissolved in 1993. The band has since had some reunion concerts, including in connection with a jubilee concert for the venue Garage in Bergen (2000) and at the 2006 Nattjazz.

Band members 
 Yngve Sætre: vocals
 Dag Igland: guitar
 Sveinung Igesund: keyboards
 Rune Kogstad: drums
 Geir Luedy Andersen: bass (−1989)
 Espen Lien: bass (1989–)

Discography 
 Brake for Nobody (EMI, 1990)
 Death in the Rockinghorse Factory (EMI, 1992)

External links 
 Biography at the Norsk pop- og rockleksikon
 Review of "Brake For Nobody" at Allmusic.com
 Soga um Barbie Bones – Freely by the memory of the skald Sveinung Leifson Igesund

Musical groups established in 1987
Norwegian rock music groups
Spellemannprisen winners
Music in Bergen